W20 may refer to:

Hansa-Brandenburg W.20, German submarine-launched reconnaissance flying boat of the World War I era
PENTAX Optio W20, a line of consumer digital cameras manufactured by Pentax Corporation
W2O Group, a California holding company for marketing and communications firms